The 2008 United States House of Representatives elections were held on November 4, 2008, to elect members to the United States House of Representatives to serve in the 111th United States Congress from January 3, 2009, until January 3, 2011. It coincided with the election of Barack Obama as President. All 435 voting seats, as well as all 6 non-voting seats, were up for election. The Democratic Party, which won a majority of seats in the 2006 election, expanded its control in 2008. 

The Republican Party, hoping to regain the majority it lost in the 2006 election or at least expand its congressional membership, lost additional seats. With one exception (Louisiana's 2nd district), the only seats to switch from Democratic to Republican had been Republican-held prior to the 2006 elections. Republicans gained five Democratic seats total, while losing 26 of their own, giving the Democrats a net gain of 21 seats, effectively erasing all gains made by the GOP since 1994. In addition, with the defeat of Republican congressman Chris Shays in Connecticut's 4th district, this became the first time since the 1850s that no Republican represented the New England region. 

The 10.6% popular vote advantage by the Democrats was the largest by either party since 1982, 26 years earlier, and as of 2022 remains the most recent time that either party won by a double-digit margin in the overall popular vote for the House of Representatives. Turnout increased due to the concurrent presidential election. The presidential election, 2008 Senate elections, and 2008 state gubernatorial elections, as well as many other state and local elections, occurred on the same date. This was the first and, as of 2022, remains the only election since 1980 in which the party of a newly elected president simultaneously gained seats in the House.

As of 2022, this remains the last election in which Democrats won congressional seats in Idaho, North Dakota, and South Dakota, the last election in which Democrats won more than one seat in Alabama, and the last election in which Democrats won a majority of seats in Arkansas, Indiana,  Mississippi, North Carolina, Ohio, Tennessee, West Virginia, and Wisconsin. It is also the last time Republicans won a seat in Delaware.

Results summary

Federal

Per state 

The number of non-voting members also includes the non-voting member-elect from Puerto Rico, Pedro Pierluisi, who is a member of the New Progressive Party of Puerto Rico, but will caucus with the Democrats. The New Progressive Party is affiliated with both the Democratic and Republican Parties and the last representative from Puerto Rico, Luis Fortuño, caucused with the Republicans. The vote total for the non-voting members also includes the Popular Democratic Party of Puerto Rico, which has ties to the Democratic Party.
Both non-voting independents, American Samoa's representative Eni Faleomavaega and the Northern Mariana Islands' representative-elect Gregorio Sablan, will caucus with the Democrats. In America Samoa all elections are non-partisan. In the Northern Mariana Islands, Sablan appeared on the ballot as an independent.

Maps

Retiring incumbents
Thirty-three incumbents voluntarily retired.

Democratic incumbents
All six seats held by retiring Democrats were won by Democrats.
 : Bud Cramer: "[T]o spend more time with my family and begin another chapter in my life"
 : Mark Udall: Ran for and won the U.S. Senate seat vacated by Wayne Allard.
 : Tom Allen: Ran against and lost to Susan Collins in the U.S. Senate election.
 : Tom Udall: Ran for and won the U.S. Senate seat vacated by Pete Domenici.
 : Michael McNulty: "[I]t's not what I want to do for the rest of my life."
 : Darlene Hooley: Because of the "cumulative effect of arduous travel, the relentless demands of fund-raising and 32 years of public service"

Republican incumbents
Twenty-seven Republicans retired. Thirteen of their seats were then won by Democrats (see Open seat gains, below).

 : Terry Everett: Because of age and health
 : Rick Renzi: To fight federal criminal charges involving a land-swap deal
 : John Doolittle: To fight an FBI corruption investigation
 : Duncan Hunter Ran for and lost the race for the Republican nomination for president. Already planned to retire
 : Tom Tancredo: Ran for and lost the race for the Republican nomination for President
 : Dave Weldon: To return to his medical practice
 : Jerry Weller: To spend more time with his family, amid questions about his Nicaraguan land dealings, his wife's investments, and his relationship to an indicted defense contractor
 : Ray LaHood (On December 19, 2008, President-elect Barack Obama announced his intention to nominate LaHood to serve as the next Secretary of Transportation.) He was later confirmed.
 : Ron Lewis
 : Jim McCrery
 : Jim Ramstad
 : Chip Pickering
 : Kenny Hulshof: Ran for and lost the election for governor
 : Jim Saxton: Because of age and health
 : Mike Ferguson: To spend more time with his family
 : Heather Wilson: Ran in and lost the Republican primary for New Mexico's open U.S. Senate seat
 : Steve Pearce: Ran for and lost the election for New Mexico's open U.S. Senate seat
 : Vito Fossella: Amid scandal following a drunk driving arrest which led to revelations of infidelity and a secret family he maintained in Virginia
 : Jim Walsh
 : Tom Reynolds
 : Dave Hobson: "I wanted to go out on top"
 : Deborah Pryce: To spend more time with her family
 : Ralph Regula
 : John Peterson: To spend more time with his family
 : Luis Fortuño: Ran for and won the Governorship of Puerto Rico defeating Gov. Aníbal Acevedo Vilá
 : Thomas M. Davis: "It's time for me to take a sabbatical"
 : Barbara Cubin

Defeated incumbents

Incumbents defeated in primary election
One Republican lost in a primary and the seat was eventually won by a Democrat. One Democrat lost the primary as did two Republicans. The three primary winners, however, managed to retain the seat for the same party.
 : Wayne Gilchrest (R), whose seat was later won by a Democrat
 : Albert Wynn (D), who subsequently resigned May 31, 2008
 : Chris Cannon (R)
 : David Davis (R)

Incumbents defeated in general election
Fourteen Republicans and five Democrats lost their general elections, thereby losing their seats to the other party.
 : Marilyn Musgrave (R)
 : Christopher Shays (R)
 : Ric Keller (R)
 : Tim Mahoney (D)
 : Tom Feeney (R)
 : Bill Sali (R)
 : Nancy Boyda (D)
 : William J. Jefferson (D)
 : Don Cazayoux (D)
 : Tim Walberg (R)
 : Joe Knollenberg (R)
 : Jon Porter (R)
 : Randy Kuhl (R)
 : Robin Hayes (R)
 : Steve Chabot (R)
 : Phil English (R)
 : Nick Lampson (D)
 : Thelma Drake (R)
 : Virgil Goode (R)

Open seat gains
Twelve seats (and one delegate's seat) held by retiring Republicans were won by Democrats. No Democratic retirements were picked up by Republicans.
 : Democratic gain.
 : Democratic gain.
 : Democratic gain.
 : Democratic gain.
 : Democratic gain.
 : Democratic gain.
 : Democratic gain.
 : Democratic gain.
 : Democratic gain.
 : Democratic gain.
 : Democratic gain.
 : NPP – caucusing with the Democrats – gain.
 : Democratic gain.

Predictions
On April 8, 2008, analyst Stuart Rothenberg of The Rothenberg Political Report stated that the fight for the House would be a "one-sided battle, with Democrats having most of the targets." He points to a list of one dozen seats (out of all 435 seats in the House) that are most likely to change hands, of those twelve, ten are open seats, seats which Republicans won by 3% or less in 2006 or otherwise endangered GOP seats.

In May 2007, conservative columnist Robert Novak wrote that he believed there were at least a few House seats that were won by Democrats in 2006 "solely because of GOP corruption," and that such seats would be "the most likely to return to the Republican column in 2008". He also said,

Novak qualified this by saying that in "previous elections, major House gains by either party have always been followed by losses in the next election".

InTrade.com, the only betting site that offered odds on control of the House, put the likelihood of the Democrats retaining control at about 90% .

There have been three special elections for open Republican seats, IL-14 (formerly held by Dennis Hastert), LA-06 (formerly held by Richard Baker) and MS-01 (formerly held by Roger Wicker). Democrats won all three elections. After the MS-01 loss, Ron Gunzburger wrote, "GOP insiders in DC now privately acknowledge the Democratic victory in this seat likely foreshadows a dismal general election ahead for congressional Republicans."

The following table rates the competitiveness of selected races from around the country according to noted political analysts. Races not included should be considered safe for the incumbent's party. (Incumbents not running for re-election have parentheses around their name.)

Special elections 
The thirteen special elections to the 110th United States Congress are listed below by election date.

In 2008 there were eight special elections for vacant seats in the United States House of Representatives, for the 110th United States Congress. In the special elections, Democrats gained three seats while keeping hold of five seats. Republicans held only one of their four seats.

|-
! 
| Dennis Hastert
| 
| 1986
|  | Incumbent resigned November 26, 2007.New member elected March 8, 2008.Democratic gain.
| nowrap | 

|-
! 
| Julia Carson
| 
| 1996
|  | Incumbent died December 17, 2007.New member elected March 11, 2008.Democratic hold.
| nowrap | 

|-
! 
| Tom Lantos
| 
| 1980
|  | Incumbent died February 11, 2008.New member elected April 8, 2008.Democratic hold.
| nowrap | 

|-
! 
| Bobby Jindal
| 
| 2004
|  | Incumbent resigned January 14, 2008, to become Governor of Louisiana.New member elected May 3, 2008.Republican hold.
| nowrap | 

|-
! 
| Richard Baker
| 
| 1986
|  | Incumbent resigned February 2, 2008, to become Director of the Managed Funds Association.New member elected May 3, 2008.Democratic gain.
| nowrap | 

|-
! 
| Roger Wicker
| 
| 1994
|  | Incumbent resigned December 31, 2007, when appointed U.S. Senator.New member elected May 13, 2008.Democratic gain.
| nowrap | 

|-
! 
| Albert Wynn
| 
| 1992
|  | Incumbent resigned May 31, 2008, after losing renomination.New member elected June 17, 2008.Democratic hold.
| nowrap | 

|-
! 
| Stephanie Tubbs Jones
| 
| 1998
|  | Incumbent died August 20, 2008.New member elected November 18, 2008.Democratic hold.
| nowrap | 

|}

Alabama

Alaska

American Samoa 
See Non-voting delegates, below.

Arizona

Arkansas

California

Colorado

Connecticut

Delaware

District of Columbia 
See Non-voting delegates, below.

Florida

Georgia

Guam 
See Non-voting delegates, below.

Hawaii

Idaho

Illinois

Indiana

Iowa

Kansas

Kentucky

Louisiana 

Note: In Louisiana's 2nd and 4th districts, primary runoffs were held November 4, 2008 and the general election for both of these races were held December 6, 2008.

Maine

Maryland

Massachusetts

Michigan

Minnesota

Mississippi

Missouri

Montana

Nebraska

Nevada

New Hampshire

New Jersey

New Mexico

New York

North Carolina

North Dakota

Northern Mariana Islands 
See Non-voting delegates, below.

Ohio

Oklahoma

Oregon

Pennsylvania

Puerto Rico 
See Non-voting delegates, below.

Rhode Island

South Carolina

South Dakota

Tennessee

Texas

U.S. Virgin Islands 
See Non-voting delegates, below.

Utah

Vermont

Virginia

Washington

West Virginia

Wisconsin

Wyoming

Non-voting delegates 

|-
! 
| Eni Faleomavaega
| 
| 1988
| Incumbent re-elected.
| nowrap | 

|-
! 
| Eleanor Holmes Norton
| 
| 1990
| Incumbent re-elected.
| nowrap | 

|-
! 
| Madeleine Bordallo
| 
| 2002
| Incumbent re-elected.
| nowrap | 

|-
! 
| colspan=3 | New seat
|  | New seat.New delegate elected.Independent gain.
| nowrap | 

|-
! 
| Luis Fortuño
|  | New Progressive/Republican
| 2004
|  | Incumbent retired to run for Governor of Puerto Rico.New resident commissioner elected.New Progressive hold.Democratic gain.
| nowrap | 

|-
! 
| Donna Christian-Christensen
| 
| 1996
| Incumbent re-elected.
| nowrap | 

|}

See also 
 2008 United States elections
 2008 United States gubernatorial elections
 2008 United States presidential election
 2008 United States Senate elections
 110th United States Congress
 111th United States Congress

Notes

References

External links 
 
 
 
 
 United States Election 2008 Web Archive from the U.S. Library of Congress